Synodontis batesii is a species of upside-down catfish native to rivers of Cameroon, the Democratic Republic of the Congo, Equatorial Guinea and Gabon.  It was first collected by G. L. Bates and described by Belgian-British zoologist George Albert Boulenger in 1907, based upon holotypes discovered in the Dja River, near Bitye in Cameroon.  The specific name "batesii" refers to the name of the collector of the first specimen.

Description 
The body of the fish is brown, blotched and marbled with darker browns.  It has three broad, dark vertical bands on the sides,  The fins are pale brown or whitish, with black spots.

Like other members of the genus, this fish has a humeral process, which is a bony spike that is attached to a hardened head cap on the fish and can be seen extending beyond the gill opening.  The first ray of the dorsal fin and the pectoral fins have a hardened first ray which is serrated.   The caudal fin is deeply forked.   It has short, cone-shaped teeth in the upper jaw. In the lower jaw, the teeth are s-shaped and movable.  The fish has one pair of long maxillary barbels, extending to about the middle of the pectoral spine, and two pairs of mandibular barbels that are often branched.  The small adipose fin is small.

This species grows to a length of  SL although specimens up to  TL have been recorded in the wild.

Habitat
It is found in the Dja River basin and the central Congo River basin. It has been seen in the Nyong River and the Ntem River of Cameroon, the Ivindo River, and the Ogooué River of Gabon, and the Río Muni of Equatorial Guinea.

References

External links

batesii
Catfish of Africa
Fish of Cameroon
Fish of the Democratic Republic of the Congo
Fish of Equatorial Guinea
Fish of Gabon
Fish described in 1907
Taxa named by George Albert Boulenger